Spinoloricus is a genus of nanaloricid loriciferans. Its type species is S. turbatio, described in 2007, and another species, native to completely anoxic environment, Spinoloricus cinziae, was described in 2014.

References

Loricifera
Protostome genera